Brush Script is a casual connecting script typeface designed in 1942 by Robert E. Smith for the American Type Founders (ATF). The face exhibits an exuberant graphic stroke emulating the look of handwritten written letters with an ink brush. Lowercase letters are deliberately irregular to further affect the look of handwritten text. The typeface was introduced in 1942 and saw near immediate success with advertisers, retailers, and in posters. Its popularity continued through the 1950s, and waned as influence of the International Typographic Style grew in the 1960s. The typeface has regained considerable popularity for its nostalgic association with the post WW2 era.

Along with Dom Casual and Mistral, it is one of the best-known casual script typefaces.

Reception
Brush Script was named #3 in "Least Favorite" nomination in 2007 designers' survey, conducted by Anthony Cahalan. "Least Favorite" is defined as "misused or overused", "ugly", "boring, dated, impractical or clichéd", "dislike or blind hatred".

Brush Script was rated #5 in "The 8 Worst Fonts In The World" list in Simon Garfield's 2010 book Just My Type.

See also
Mistral
Dom Casual
Waltograph

References

Jaspert, W. Pincus, W. Turner Berry and A.F. Johnson. The Encyclopedia of Type Faces. Blandford Press Ltd.: 1953, 1983. .

External links

Type Gallery - Brush Script

American Type Founders typefaces
Casual script typefaces
Typefaces and fonts introduced in 1942